Emanuel Willis Wilson (August 11, 1844May 28, 1905) was the seventh governor of West Virginia, elected in 1884, and serving from 1885 to 1890.

When the West Virginia Legislature disputed the election of 1888, both Governor Wilson and State Senate President Robert S. Carr claimed the right to sit as Governor until the dispute was resolved. The Supreme Court of Appeals of West Virginia ruled that Wilson should remain Governor. He left office on February 6, 1890, because the Legislature had decided Aretas B. Fleming had defeated Nathan Goff, Jr. After leaving the governor's office, Wilson had an unsuccessful bid for Congress.

Wilson was governor during the period of the Hatfield-McCoy feud. Devil Anse Hatfield named a son, Emanuel Willis Hatfield, born on February 10, 1888, for him.

He was married to Henrietta Cotton.  He died on May 28, 1905.

See also
List of governors of West Virginia

References

West Virginia Archives & History

External links
Biography of Emanuel W. Wilson, WV State Archives
Inaugural Address of Emanuel W. Wilson

1844 births
1905 deaths
Burials at Spring Hill Cemetery (Charleston, West Virginia)
Democratic Party governors of West Virginia
People from Harpers Ferry, West Virginia
Speakers of the West Virginia House of Delegates
Democratic Party members of the West Virginia House of Delegates
19th-century American politicians